Prinair is a Puerto Rican charter operator airline. It was Puerto Rico's domestic and international flag carrier airline for almost two decades from the mid-1960s to the mid-1980s. Despite previously ceasing scheduled commercial operations twice, it restarted charter flights in 2019.

History 
Service began in 1966 under the name Aerolíneas de Ponce (Ponce Airlines) with Aero Commander aircraft. The initial service flew from Mercedita Airport in Ponce to Luis Muñoz Marín International Airport (then known as Isla Verde International Airport) in San Juan. The company's name was changed to Prinair the following year (Puerto Rico International Airlines).

The airline later used de Havilland Heron piston-engined aircraft for its services.  Prinair introduced their own version of the Heron by converting the aircraft to use 300 hp Continental IO-520 engines in place of the original 250 hp Gipsy Queen 30-2 engines.  The Prinair fleet which grew to over 20 aircraft was the largest Heron fleet in the world. During the 1970s, expansion saw the airline start cargo freighter services to Opa-locka (a Florida location near Miami) as well as passenger service to Santo Domingo, the Virgin Islands (U.S. and British), Martinique, Barbados, Puerto Plata, and other Caribbean destinations, as well as Vieques, Mayagüez, Culebra and Aguadilla on the domestic side.

During 1978, Nicolas Nogueras, a Puerto Rican politician, sought a writ of certiorari against Prinair at the United States Supreme Court; he was denied.

In the early 1980s, Prinair introduced into service larger and more capable Convair 580 turboprop aircraft. This provided the plane spotter at San Juan with another interesting aircraft type to look out for, but did little for the airline other than help increase the earnings from the Virgin Islands routes. Increased competition for these routes from Aero Virgin Islands and Oceanair, in addition to a measure of distrust from the public that had not forgotten a number of fatal crashes, resulted in Prinair ceasing operations in 1985. It was the intention that Prinair would have been one of the launch customers of the CASA CN-235 and at the roll-out of the new aircraft in September 1983 the prototype was actually painted in Prinair colors (right side only). However, the demise of Prinair prevented delivery.  The airline did operate an earlier CASA-manufactured aircraft, the C-212 Aviocar turboprop.

In 2007, the airline resumed operations with Piper Chieftain propeller-driven aircraft; The airline again ceased all flights in 2010.

The company's Prinairtours announced that in 2019 Prinair would relaunch flights as a charter airline, starting with services between Aguadilla on Puerto Rico's northwest coast and Punta Cana, Dominican Republic.

Incidents and accidents 
Prinair suffered three fatal accidents and two non-fatal hijacking incidents during its existence.

On March 5, 1969 Prinair Flight 277 departed Saint Thomas, U.S. Virgin Islands for a flight to San Juan. Seventeen minutes after take-off, the crew contacted San Juan Approach Control. The approach controller on duty (a trainee) replied; "Prinair Two Seven Seven, San Juan Approach Control, radar contact three miles east of Isla Verde...maintain four thousand." The aircraft was actually three miles east of the Fajardo waypoint instead of the Isla Verde waypoint (which is located about 10 miles west of the Fajardo waypoint). Six minutes later the aircraft crashed in the Sierra de Luquillo mountains at an elevation of about 2400 feet; all 19 occupants were killed. The accident investigation found that Air Traffic Control was to blame.

On June 24, 1972 Prinair Flight 191 crashed after going around just after touching down at Ponce's Mercedita Airport, killing five of the 20 occupants (including both pilots). An accident investigation found that the go-around was prompted by a vehicle on the runway, but the investigation was re-opened three years after the accident due to evidence that there was no vehicle on the runway; the second investigation concluded that the go-around was due to unknown reasons.

Prinair Flight 610 crashed moments after taking off at Saint Croix, U.S. Virgin Islands on July 24, 1979, with the loss of eight lives. An accident investigation found that the aircraft had been overloaded by 1,060 pounds and that the center of gravity (CG) was 8 inches beyond the maximum rear limit.

Destinations in 1981 

According to the February 1, 1981 Prinair system timetable route map, the airline was operating scheduled passenger service to the following destinations in the Caribbean.  All flights were operated with either Convair 580 turboprop or de Havilland Heron prop aircraft at this time:

 Antigua, West Indies
 Guadeloupe, Caribbean
 Mayaguez, Puerto Rico
 Ponce, Puerto Rico - Airline headquarters
 St. Croix, U.S. Virgin Islands
 St. Kitts, West Indies
 St. Maarten, Netherlands Antilles
 St. Thomas, U.S. Virgin Islands
 San Juan, Puerto Rico - Hub
 Santo Domingo, Dominican Republic
 Tortola, British Virgin Islands

Historical fleet 
 28 – de Havilland Heron 
 4 – Convair CV-580 
 7 – CASA C-212 Aviocar

A second version of Prinair operated between 2007 and 2010 with Piper Chieftain aircraft.

In popular culture 
A Prinair Beechcraft King Air aircraft appears in the 2022 film The Lost City

See also 
 List of airlines of Puerto Rico
 Aeronaves de Puerto Rico
 Oceanair
 VAL

References 

 
Airlines of Puerto Rico
Airlines established in 1966
Airlines established in 2007
Airlines established in 2019
Airlines disestablished in 1985
Airlines disestablished in 2010
1966 establishments in Puerto Rico
Economic history of Puerto Rico
2007 establishments in Puerto Rico
2010 disestablishments in Puerto Rico
Companies based in Ponce, Puerto Rico
2019 establishments in Puerto Rico
Companies based in Aguadilla, Puerto Rico